Watkins is an unincorporated community and census-designated place in southeastern Benton County, Iowa, United States. As of the 2010 census, it had a population of 118. Watkins lies along local roads south of the city of Vinton, the county seat of Benton County. Although Watkins is unincorporated, it has a post office, with the ZIP code of 52354, which opened on 15 December 1873.

Watkins was platted in 1874. The community was named for J. B. Watkins, a railroad official.

Watkins is within the Benton Community School District.

Demographics

References

Census-designated places in Benton County, Iowa
Census-designated places in Iowa
1874 establishments in Iowa
Populated places established in 1874